William Nicoll may refer to:
 William Nicoll (politician, born 1657) (1657–1723), English-born American merchant and politician who served as the Speaker of the New York General Assembly
 William Nicoll Jr. (1702 –1768), English-American merchant and politician who served as the Speaker of the New York General Assembly, son of the above
 Sir William Robertson Nicoll (1851–1923), Scottish Free Church minister, journalist and editor
 William M. Nicoll (1893–1970), Scottish-American lawyer, politician, and judge from New York

See also
 William Nicol (disambiguation)
 William Nichol (disambiguation)